Nubosoplatus inbio is a species of beetle in the family Cerambycidae, the only species in the genus Nubosoplatus.

References

Pteroplatini
Monotypic beetle genera